Nazym Kyzaibay (Nazym Abaiqyzy Qyzaibai; born 14 September 1993) is a Kazakh light flyweight and flyweight amateur boxer.  She won the light flyweight world title in 2014 and 2016.

Biography
Nazym Kyzaibay was born in 1993, 14 of September, in Zhetigen village of Almaty region. She is the third child in her family.

Career
She won a bronze medal at the  2012 AIBA Women's World Boxing Championships. In Qinhuangdao, Nazym losing to Xu Shiqi of China in the semifinal match.

At the 2014 AIBA Women's World Boxing Championships in Jeju, she beat Moreen Ajambo in the first round, Bak Cho-rong in the second round, Steluţa Duţă in quarterfinals and Madoka Wada in semifinals. In the final she defeated Sarjubala Devi of India.

At the 2016 AIBA Women's World Boxing Championships in Astana, Nazym won the gold medal, beating Angelika Grońska, Lise Sandebjer, Sarjubala Shamjetsabam, U Yong-gum and Wang Yuyan of China.

Hobby
Nazym loves drawing and playing football.

References

External links
Nazym Kyzaibay at the Confederation.kz

1993 births
Living people
Kazakhstani women boxers
AIBA Women's World Boxing Championships medalists
Boxers at the 2018 Asian Games
Asian Games competitors for Kazakhstan
Flyweight boxers
People from Almaty Region
21st-century Kazakhstani women